Regional elections were held in Denmark on 3 March 1970.  4677 municipal council members were elected to the 1970 - 1974 term of office in the 277 municipalities, as well as 366 members of the 14 counties of Denmark. The term of office was 1 April 1970 - 31 March 1974. In Copenhagen County Sengeløse was created a municipality from 1 April 1970, but existed only until 31 March 1974. It was abolished 1 April 1974, becoming part of Høje-Taastrup Municipality. Store Magleby parish municipality merged with Dragør parish municipality to become Dragør Municipality from 1 April 1974. From 1 April 1974 there were 275 municipalities in Denmark.

Results of regional elections
The results of the regional elections:

County Councils

Municipal Councils

References

1970
1970 elections in Denmark
March 1970 events in Europe